There are several names for the number 0 in different languages.

References 

0 (number)
Integers
0